Euagra coelestina is a moth of the subfamily Arctiinae. It was described by Caspar Stoll in 1781. It is found in Suriname and the Brazilian state of Pará.

References

 

Arctiinae
Moths described in 1782